This is a Mexican American bibliography. This list consists of books, and journal articles, about Mexican Americans, Chicanos, and their history and culture. The list includes works of literature whose subject matter is significantly about Mexican Americans and the Chicano/a experience. This list does not include works by Mexican American writers which do not address the topic, such as science texts by Mexican American writers.

Reference works
Dictionary of Literary Biography, Volume 209: Chicano Writers, Third Series 
Borderline: A Bibliography of the United States-Mexico Borderlands (Massive tool for locating social sciences and humanities research materials dealing with the borderlands region. Some entries annotated; includes author index. Barbara G. Valk, et al., eds. Purdy/Kresge Library, LCCN Z 1251 .M44 V35 1988)
Chicano Anthology Index: A Comprehensive Author, Title and Subject Index to Chicano Anthologies, 1965-1987 (Massive index to over 5000 essays and literary works about Chicanos. Includes subject, author, title indexes.) Francisco García-Ayvens. 1990. Purdy/Kresge Reference, LCCN Z1361.M4 G37 1990

Biographies
Garcia, Mario T. The Making of a Mexican-American Mayor: Raymond L. Telles and the Origins of Latino Political Power University of Arizona Press, 2018.

Histories

Chicano Movement
Cervantes, Leo. More than a century of the Chicano movement. 2004
Chávez, Ernesto. "Mi raza primero!" (My people first!) : nationalism, identity, and insurgency in the Chicano movement in Los Angeles, 1966-1978 Berkeley : University of California Press, c2002. (available online from UC campuses)
Delgado, Abelardo B. The Chicano movement: some not too objective observations Denver, Colo.: distributed by Totinem Publications, 1971.
García, Ignacio M.  Chicanismo: the forging of a militant ethos among Mexican Americans Tucson : University of Arizona Press, 1997.
  Gómez-Quiñones, Juan, and Irene Vásquez. Making Aztlán: Ideology and Culture of the Chicana and Chicano Movement, 1966-1977 (2014), 460pp  
Mariscal, George. Brown-Eyed Children of the Sun: Lessons from the Chicano Movement 1965-1975.  Albuquerque : University of New Mexico Press, 2005.
 Meier, Matt S., and Margo Gutiérrez. Encyclopedia of the Mexican American civil rights movement (Greenwood 2000) online
Muñoz, Carlos. Youth, Identity, Power: The Chicano Movement.  London and New York: Verso, 1989.
Oropeza, Lorena. Raza sí!, guerra no!: Chicano protest and patriotism during the Viet Nam war era. Berkeley : University of California Press, 2005.
 Orozco, Cynthia E. No Mexicans, women, or dogs allowed: The rise of the Mexican American civil rights movement (University of Texas Press, 2010) online
 Quiroz, Anthony (ed.), Leaders of the Mexican American Generation: Biographical Essays. Boulder, CO: University Press of Colorado, 2015.
 Rivas-Rodriguez, Maggie. Texas Mexican Americans and Postwar Civil Rights. Austin, TX: University of Texas Press, 2015.
 Rosales, F. Arturo. Chicano! The History of the Mexican American Civil Rights Movement. (Arte Público Press, 1997); online
San Miguel, Guadalupe. Brown, not white : school integration and the Chicano movement in Houston College Station : Texas A&M University Press, 2001.
  Sánchez, George I. "Ideology, and Whiteness in the Making of the Mexican American Civil Rights Movement, 1930–1960" Journal of Southern History  (2006) 72#3 pp. 569–604 in JSTOR
Treviño, Jesús Salvador. Eyewitness : a filmmaker’s memoir of the Chicano Movement Houston, Tex. : Arte Pʹublico Press, 2001.
Trujillo, Armando L. Chicano empowerment and bilingual education : movimiento politics in Crystal City, Texas New York : Garland Pub., c1998.
Vigil, Ernesto B. The Crusade for Justice: Chicano Militancy and the Government's War On Dissent Madison University of Wisconsin Press, 1999.

General histories
 Acuña, Rodolfo. Occupied America. New York: Harpercollins, 1988.
 Gonzales-Berry, Erlinda and David Maciel. Contested Homeland: a Chicano History of New Mexico.  Albuquerque, NM: University of New Mexico Press, 2000.
 De Anda, Roberto M. Chicanas and Chicanos in Contemporary Society. Boston: Allyn and Bacon, 1996.
 Del Castillo, Richard Griswold. La Familia: Chicano Families in the Urban Southwest, 1848 to the Present. Notre Dame, IN: Notre Dame University Press, 1984.
 Foley, Neil. Mexicans in the Making of America. Cambridge, MA: Belknap Press, 2014.
 Iber, Jorge. Hispanics in the American West Santa Barbara, CA: ABC-CLIO, 2006.
 Martínez, Elizabeth "Betita". 500 Years of Chicana Women's History/500 Años de Historia Chicana. New Brunswick, NJ: Rutgers University Press, 2007.
 Meier, Matt S., and Feliciano Ribera. Mexican Americans/American Mexicans: From Conquistadors to Chicanos. New York: Hill and Wang, 1993.
 Sanchez, George J. Becoming Mexican American:Ethnicity, Culture, and Identity in Chicano Los Angeles. Berkeley, CA: University of California Press, 1993.
 Segura Camacho, Julian. The Chicano treatise Lanham, MD: University Press of America, 2005.
 Shane, C.J. (editor). The Mexicans. Farmington, MI: Greenhaven Press, 2005.
 Ruiz Vicki L. From Out of the Shadows: Mexican Women in Twentieth-Century America. NY: Oxford University Press, 1998.

Other works

 Barrow, Lisa and Rouse, Cecilia Elena. "Do Returns to Schooling Differ by Race and Ethnicity?" American Economic Review 2005 95(2): 83–87.  Fulltext: in Ingenta and Ebsco
 Jack Citrin, Amy Lerman, Michael Murakami and Kathryn Pearson, "Testing Huntington: Is Hispanic Immigration a Threat to American Identity?" Perspectives on Politics, Volume 5, Issue 01, February 2007, pp 31–48
 De La Garza, Rodolfo O., Martha Menchaca, Louis DeSipio. Barrio Ballots: Latino Politics in the 1990 Elections (1994)
 De la Garza, Rodolfo O. Awash in the Mainstream: Latino Politics in the 1996 Elections (1999) * De la Garza, Rodolfo O., and Louis Desipio. Ethnic Ironies: Latino Politics in the 1992 Elections (1996)
 De la Garza, Rodolfo O. Et al. Latino Voices: Mexican, Puerto Rican, and Cuban Perspectives on American Politics (1992)
 Arnoldo De León, Mexican Americans in Texas: A Brief History, 2nd ed. (1999)
 Erlinda Gonzales-Berry, David R. Maciel, editors, The Contested Homeland: A Chicano History of New Mexico 2000, 
 Nancie L. González; The Spanish-Americans of New Mexico: A Heritage of Pride (1969)
 Hero, Rodney E. Latinos and the U.S. Political System: Two-Tiered Pluralism. (1992)
 Garcia, F. Chris. Latinos and the Political System. (1988)
 Samuel P. Huntington. Who Are We: The Challenges to America's National Identity (2005)
 Kenski, Kate and Tisinger, Russell. "Hispanic Voters in the 2000 and 2004 Presidential General Elections." Presidential Studies Quarterly 2006 36(2): 189–202.  Fulltext: in Swetswise and Ingenta
 David Montejano, Anglos and Mexicans in the Making of Texas, 1836–1986 (1987)
 Pachon, Harry and Louis Desipio. New Americans by Choice: Political Perspectives of Latino Immigrants. (1994)
 Rosales, Francisco A., Chicano!: The history of the Mexican American civil rights movement. (1997). 
 Smith, Robert Courtney. Mexican New York: Transnational Lives of New Immigrants (2005), links with old village, based on interviews
 South, Scott J.; Crowder, Kyle; and Chavez, Erick. "Geographic Mobility and Spatial Assimilation among U.S. Latino Immigrants." International Migration Review 2005 39(3): 577–607. 
 Suárez-Orozco, Marcelo M. And Mariela M. Páez. Latinos: Remaking America. (2002)
 Villarreal, Roberto E., and Norma G. Hernandez. Latinos and Political Coalitions: Political Empowerment for the 1990s (1991)
 
 William A. Nericcio (2007). "Tex(t)-Mex: Seductive Hallucination of the 'Mexican' in America"; utpress book; book galleryblog
 John R. Chavez (1984). "The Lost Land: A Chicano Image of the American Southwest", New Mexico University Publications.

Surveys and historiography
 Acuña, Rodolfo F. Occupied America: A History of Chicanos (2010)
 Bean, Frank D.,  and Marta Tienda. The Hispanic Population of the United States (1987), statistical analysis of demography and social structure
 Chabran, Richard, and Rafael Chabran. The Latino Encyclopedia (6 vol. 1996)
 De Leon, Arnoldo, and Carlos E. Cuéllar. "Chicanos in the City: A Review of the Monographic Literature," The History Teacher (1996) 29#3 pp. 363–378 in JSTOR
 De Leon, Arnoldo, and Richard Griswold Del Castillo. North to Aztlan: A History of Mexican Americans in the United States (2006)
 Garcia, Richard A. "Changing Chicano Historiography," Reviews in American History 34.4 (2006) 521–528 in Project MUSE
Gomez, Laura E. Manifest Destinies: The Making of the Mexican American Race (2008)
 Gomez-Quiñones, Juan. Mexican American Labor, 1790-1990. (1994).
Gonzales, Manuel G.  Mexicanos: A History of Mexicans in the United States (2nd ed 2009) excerpt and text search
 Gutiérrez, David G.  ed. The Columbia History of Latinos in the United States Since 1960 (2004) 512pp excerpt and text search
 Meier, Matt S.  Notable Latino Americans: A Biographical Dictionary (1997) 431pp; 127 longer biographies  excerpt and text search
 Meier, Matt S. Mexican American The biographies: A Historical Dictionary, 1836-1987 (1988) 237pp; 270 shortwer biographies
Rochín, Refugio I., and Denis N. Valdés, eds. Voices of a New Chicana/o History. (2000). 307 pp. 14 articles by scholars
 Ruiz, Vicki L. "Nuestra América: Latino History as United States History," Journal of American History, 93 (Dec. 2006), 655–72.
 Ruiz, Vicki L. From Out of the Shadows: Mexican Women in Twentieth-Century America (1998)
 Vargas, Zaragosa. Crucible of Struggle: A History of Mexican Americans from the Colonial Period to the Present Era (2010)

Pre 1965
 Bogardus, Emory S. The Mexican in the United States (1934), sociological
 Escobedo, Elizabeth. From Coveralls to Zoot Suits: The Lives of Mexican American Women on the World War II Home Front (2013)
 Gamio, Manuel. The Life Story of the Mexican Immigrant (1931)
 Gamio, Manuel. Mexican Immigration to the United States (1939)
 García, Mario T. Mexican Americans: Leadership, Ideology and Identity, 1930–1960 (1989)
 Gomez-Quinones, Juan. Roots of Chicano Politics, 1600-1940 (1994)
 Grebler, Leo, Joan Moore, and Ralph Guzmán. The Mexican American People: The Nation's Second Largest Minority (1970), emphasis  on census data and statistics
Hernández, José Angel. Mexican American Colonization during the Nineteenth Century: A History of the U.S.-Mexico Borderlands (2012)  excerpt and text search* Rivas-Rodríguez, Maggie ed. Mexican Americans and World War II (2005)
 Sanchez, George J. Becoming Mexican American: Ethnicity, Culture, and Identity in Chicano Los Angeles, 1900-1945 (1995) excerpt and text search

Culture and politics, post 1965
 Aranda, José, Jr.  When We Arrive: A New Literary History of Mexican America. U. of Arizona Press, 2003. 256 pp. 
 Arreola, Daniel D., ed.  Hispanic Spaces, Latino Places: Community and Cultural Diversity in Contemporary America. 2004. 334 pp. 
 Badillo, David A.  Latinos and the New Immigrant Church. 2006. 275 pp.  excerpt and text search
 Berg, Charles Ramírez.  Latino Images in Film: Stereotypes, Subversion, and Resistance. 2002. 314 pp. 
 Branton, Regina. "Latino Attitudes toward Various Areas of Public Policy: The Importance of Acculturation,"  Political Research Quarterly, Vol. 60, No. 2, 293-303 (2007) Abstract
 Burt, Kenneth C. The Search for a Civic Voice: California Latino Politics, Regina Books, 2007.  Excerpts and online search from Amazon.com
 DeGenova, Nicholas and Ramos-Zayas, Ana Y.  Latino Crossings: Mexicans, Puerto Ricans, and the Politics of Race and Citizenship. 2003. 257 pp. 
 Dolan, Jay P. and Gilberto M. Hinojosa; Mexican Americans and the Catholic Church, 1900-1965 (1994)
 Francis-Fallon, Benjamin. The Rise of the Latino Vote: A History (2019)
 Fregoso, Rosa Linda. The Bronze Screen: Chicana and Chicano Film Culture. (1993) excerpt and text search
 Garcia, Ignacio M.  Viva Kennedy: Mexican Americans in Search of Camelot, Texas A&M University Press, 2000. 227pp Excerpts and online search from Amazon.com.
 García, Mario T. Mexican Americans: Leadership, Ideology and Identity, 1930–1960 (1989)
 García, María Cristina. Seeking Refuge: Central American Migration to Mexico, The United States, and Canada. (2006) 290pp
 Gomez-Quinones, Juan. Chicano Politics: Reality and Promise, 1940-1990 (1990)
 Gutiérrez, David G. Walls and Mirrors: Mexican Americans, Mexican Immigrants, and the Politics of Ethnicity in the Southwest, 1910-1986 1995. excerpt and text search
 Gutiérrez, David G.  "Migration, Emergent Ethnicity, and the "Third Space": The Shifting Politics of Nationalism in Greater Mexico" Journal of American History 1999 86(2): 481-517. in JSTOR  covers 1800 to the 1980s
 Hammerback, John C., Richard J. Jensen, and Jose Angel Gutierrez. A War of Words: Chicano Protest in the 1960s and 1970s 1985. 
 Martinez, Juan Francisco. Sea La Luz: The Making of Mexican Protestantism in the American Southwest, 1829-1900 (2006)
 Matovina, Timothy.  Guadalupe and Her Faithful: Latino Catholics in San Antonio, from Colonial Origins to the Present. 2005. 232 pp.  excerpt and text search
 Meier, Matt S., and Margo Gutierrez, ed. Encyclopedia of the Mexican American Civil Rights Movement (2000) excerpt and text search
 Ontiveros, Randy J. In the Spirit of a New People: The Cultural Politics of the Chicano Movement (New York University Press; 2013) 288 pages; how Chicano artists and activists of the 1960s and 1970s used fiction, poetry, visual arts, & theater
 Rosales, Francisco A., Chicano!: The history of the Mexican American civil rights movement, (Houston: Arte Público Press, 1997). 
 Saldívar-Hull, Sonia. Feminism on the Border: Chicana Gender Politics and Literature 2000.   excerpt and text search
 Sears, David O., Felix Danbold, and Vanessa M. Zavala. "Incorporation of Latino immigrants into the American party system." RSF: The Russell Sage Foundation Journal of the Social Sciences 2 #3 (2016): 183-204. Online
 Wegner, Kyle David, "Children of Aztlán: Mexican American Popular Culture and the Post-Chicano Aesthetic" (PhD dissertation  State University of New York, Buffalo, 2006). Order No. DA3213898.
Vivancos Perez, Ricardo F. Radical Chicana Poetics (Palgrave Macmillan, 2013).

Voting since 2000
 Barreto, Matt A., and Loren Collingwood. "Group-based appeals and the Latino vote in 2012: How immigration became a mobilizing issue." Electoral Studies 40 (2015): 490-499. Online
 Bell, Aaron. "The Role of the Latino Vote in the 2016 Elections." (2016). Online
 Coffin, Malcolm. "The Latino Vote: Shaping Americas Electoral Future". Political Quarterly.  74#2 (2003):  214–222. doi:10.1111/1467-923x.00531
 Collingwood, Loren, Matt A. Barreto, and Sergio I. Garcia-Rios. "Revisiting Latino voting: Cross-racial mobilization in the 2012 election." Political Research Quarterly  67.3 (2014): 632-645. online
 Francis-Fallon, Benjamin. The Rise of the Latino Vote: A History (Harvard  UP, 2019).
 Leal, David L., et al. "The Latino vote in the 2004 election." PS: Political Science & Politics 38.1 (2005): 41-49. online
 Kenski, Kate and Tisinger, Russell. "Hispanic Voters in the 2000 and 2004 Presidential General Elections." Presidential Studies Quarterly 2006 36(2): 189-202. 
 Lopez, Mark Hugo, and Ana Gonzalez-Barrera. "Inside the 2012 Latino electorate." ( Pew 2013) online.
 Nicholson, Stephen P., Adrian Pantoja, and Gary M. Segura. "Political knowledge and issue voting among the Latino electorate." Political Research Quarterly 59.2 (2006): 259-271. Online
 Nuño, Stephen A. "Latino mobilization and vote choice in the 2000 presidential election." American Politics Research 35.2 (2007): 273-293. Online
 Reny, Tyler, Bryan Wilcox-Archuleta, and Vanessa Cruz Nichols. "Threat, Mobilization, and Latino Voting in the 2018 Election." The Forum 16#4  (2018)  online
 Sanchez, Gabriel R., and Barbara Gomez-Aguinaga. "Latino Rejection of the Trump Campaign." Aztlán: A Journal of Chicano Studies 42.2 (2017).  Online

Discrimination
 Barkan, Elliott R. “Return of the Nativists? California Public Opinion and Immigration in the 1980s and 1990s.” Social Science History 27#2 2003, pp. 229–83. online

 Durán, Robert J., and Jason A. Campos. "The war on gangs and gangsters: The Latino/a experience with settler colonialism." in Routledge International Handbook of Critical Gang Studies (Routledge, 2021) pp. 271-283.
 Gonzales, Phillip B., Renato Rosaldo, and Mary Louise Pratt, eds. Trumpism, Mexican America, and the Struggle for Latinx Citizenship (U of New Mexico Press, 2021).
 Guglielmo, Thomas A. “Fighting for Caucasian Rights: Mexicans, Mexican Americans, and the Transnational Struggle for Civil Rights in World War II Texas.” Journal of American History 92#4, 2006, pp. 1212–37. online
 Hartman, Todd K., Benjamin J. Newman, and C. Scott Bell. "Decoding prejudice toward Hispanics: Group cues and public reactions to threatening immigrant behavior." Political Behavior 36.1 (2014): 143-163. online also see abridged version.
 Hoffman, Abraham. "Stimulus to repatriation: The 1931 federal deportation drive and the Los Angeles Mexican community." Pacific Historical Review 42.2 (1973): 205-219. online
 Hoffman, Abraham. Unwanted Mexican Americans in the great depression: repatriation pressures, 1929-1939 (1974) online.

 Kang, Yowei, and Kenneth C.C. Yang. "Communicating Racism and Xenophobia in the Era of Donald Trump: A Computational Framing Analysis of the US-Mexico Cross-Border Wall Discourses." Howard Journal of Communications 33.2 (2022): 140-159.
 López, Ian F. Haney. Racism on trial: The Chicano fight for justice ( Harvard University Press, 2004).
 López, Ian F. Haney. Racism on trial: The Chicano fight for justice ( Harvard University Press, 2004).
 Muñoz, Carlos. "The Chicano Movement: Mexican American history and the struggle for equality." Perspectives on global development and technology 17.1-2 (2018): 31-52.
 Urbina, Martin Guevara, and Sofía Espinoza Álvarez, eds. Hispanics in the US criminal justice system: Ethnicity, ideology, and social control (Charles C Thomas Publisher, 2018).

 Verea, Mónica. "Anti-immigrant and Anti-Mexican attitudes and policies during the first 18 months of the Trump Administration." Norteamérica 13.2 (2018): 197-226. online

 Willis-Esqueda, Cynthia. "Bad characters and desperados: latinxs and causal explanations for legal system bias." UCLA Law Review 67 (2020): 1204+. online

Regional and Local

California
 Bancroft, Hubert Howe.    vol 18-24, History of California to 1890
 Bedolla, Lisa García.  Fluid Borders: Latino Power, Identity, and Politics in Los Angeles. 2005. 279 pp. 
 Burt, Kenneth C. The Search for a Civic Voice: California Latino Politics (2007) excerpt and text search
 Camarillo, Albert. Chicanos in a Changing Society: From Mexican Pueblos to American Barrios in Santa Barbara and Southern California, 1848–1930 (1979)
 Camarillo, Albert M., "Cities of Color: The New Racial Frontier in California’s Minority-Majority Cities," Pacific Historical Review, 76 (Feb. 2007), 1–28; looks at cities of Compton, East Palo Alto, and Seaside
 Chavez, Ernesto. "Mi Raza Primero! (My People First!): Nationalism, Identity, and Insurgency in the Chicano Movement in Los Angeles, 1966-1978." 2002. 166 pp.
 Daniel, Cletus E. Bitter Harvest: A History of California Farmworkers, 1870-1941 1981.
 García, Matt. A World of Its Own: Race, Labor, and Citrus in the Making of Greater Los Angeles, 1900-1970 (2001),
 Hayes-Bautista, David E.  La Nueva California: Latinos in the Golden State. U. of California Press, 2004. 263 pp. excerpt and text search
 Hughes, Charles. "The Decline of the Californios: The Case of San Diego, 1846-1856" The Journal of San Diego History Summer 1975, Volume 21, Number 3 online at 
 McWilliams, Carey. North from Mexico. (1949), farm workers in California
 Pitt, Leonard. The Decline of the Californios: A Social History of the Spanish-Speaking Californians, 1846-1890
 Sánchez; George J. Becoming Mexican American: Ethnicity, Culture, and Identity in Chicano Los Angeles, 1900-1945 (1993) excerpt and text search
 Valle, Victor M. and Torres, Rodolfo D.  Latino Metropolis. 2000. 249 pp. on Los Angeles

Texas and Southwest
 Alonzo, Armando C. Tejano Legacy: Rancheros and Settlers in South Texas, 1734-1900 (1998)
 Hubert Howe Bancroft. The Works of Hubert Howe Bancroft,
 v 15: History of the North Mexican States and Texas, Volume 1: 1531 - 1800
 v 16 History of the North Mexican States and Texas, Volume 2: 1801 - 1889
  Vol. 17 History of Arizona and New Mexico 1530-1888) (1889)
 Bancroft, Hubert Howe.  v 15: History of the North Mexican States and Texas, Volume 1: 1531 - 1800; v 16 History of the North Mexican States and Texas, Volume 2: 1801 - 1889
 Bancroft, Hubert Howe.   Vol. 17 History of Arizona and New Mexico 1530-1888) (1889)
 Blackwelder, Julia Kirk. Women of the Depression: Caste and Culture in San Antonio 1984. excerpt and text search
 Buitron Jr., Richard A. The Quest for Tejano Identity in San Antonio, Texas, 1913-2000 (2004) excerpt and text search
 Chávez, John R. The Lost Land: The Chicano Image of the Southwest (Albuquerque, 1984)
 Chávez-García, Miroslava. Negotiating Conquest: Gender and Power in California, 1770s to 1880s (2004).
 De León, Arnoldo. They Called Them Greasers: Anglo Attitudes toward Mexicans in Texas, 1821–1900 (Austin, 1983)
 De León, Arnoldo. Mexican Americans in Texas: A Brief History, 2nd ed. (1999)
 De León, Arnoldo.  “Whither Tejano History: Origins, Development, and Status,” Southwestern Historical Quarterly 106 (January 2003) 349–364. historiography
 Deutsch, Sarah No Separate Refuge: Culture, Class, and Gender on the Anglo-Hispanic Frontier in the American Southwest, 1880-1940 1987
 Dysart, Jane. "Mexican Women in San Antonio, 1830-1860: The Assimilation Process" Western Historical Quarterly 7 (October 1976): 365-375. in JSTOR
 Echeverría, Darius V., "Aztlán Arizona: Abuses, Awareness, Animosity, and Activism amid Mexican-Americans, 1968–1978" PhD dissertation (Temple University, 2006). Order No. DA3211867.
 Fregoso; Rosa Linda. Mexicana Encounters: The Making of Social Identities on the Borderlands (2003)
 García, Richard A. Rise of the Mexican American Middle Class: San Antonio, 1929-1941 (1991)
 García, Mario T. Desert Immigrants. The Mexicans of El Paso, 1880-1920 (1982) 348 pp. * Getz; Lynne Marie. Schools of Their Own: The Education of Hispanos in New Mexico, 1850-1940 (1997)
 Glasrud, Bruce A. et al. eds. Discovering Texas History, (U of Oklahoma Press, 2014), essays by scholars; 
 Gómez-Quiñones, Juan. Roots of Chicano Politics, 1600-1940 (1994)
 Gonzales-Berry, Erlinda, David R. Maciel, eds, The Contested Homeland: A Chicano History of New Mexico, 314 pages (2000), 
 González; Nancie L. The Spanish-Americans of New Mexico: A Heritage of Pride (1969)
 Guglielmo, Thomas A. “Fighting for Caucasian Rights: Mexicans, Mexican Americans, and the Transnational Struggle for Civil Rights in World War II Texas.” Journal of American History 92#4, 2006, pp. 1212–37. online
 Gutiérrez; Ramón A. When Jesus Came, the Corn Mothers Went Away: Marriage, Sexuality, and Power in New Mexico, 1500-1846 (1991)
 Márquez, Benjamin. LULAC: The Evolution of a Mexican American Political Organization (1993)
 Matovina, Timothy M. Tejano Religion and Ethnicity, San Antonio, 1821-1860 (1995)
 Montejano, David. Anglos and Mexicans in the Making of Texas, 1836-1986 (1987)
 Muñoz, Laura K., "Desert Dreams: Mexican American Education in Arizona, 1870–1930" (PhD dissertation Arizona State University, 2006). Order No. DA3210182.
 Quintanilla, Linda J., "Chicana Activists of Austin and Houston, Texas: A Historical Analysis" (University of Houston, 2005). Order No. DA3195964.
 Sánchez; George I. Forgotten People: A Study of New Mexicans (1940; reprint 1996) on New Mexico
 Taylor, Paul S. Mexican Labor in the United States. 2 vols. 1930-1932, on Texas
 Stewart, Kenneth L., and Arnoldo De León. Not Room Enough: Mexicans, Anglos, and Socioeconomic Change in Texas, 1850-1900 (1993)
 de la Teja, Jesús F. San Antonio de Béxar: A Community on New Spain's Northern Frontier (1995).
 Tijerina, Andrés. Tejanos and Texas under the Mexican Flag, 1821-1836 (1994),
 Tijerina, Andrés. Tejano Empire: Life on the South Texas Ranchos (1998).
 Timmons, W. H. El Paso: A Borderlands History (1990).
 Trevino, Roberto R. The Church in the Barrio: Mexican American Ethno-Catholicism in Houston. (2006). 308pp.
 Weber, David J. The Mexican Frontier, 1821-1846: The American Southwest under Mexico (1982)

Other regions
 Allegro, Linda and Andrew Grant Wood, eds. Latin American Migrations to the U.S. Heartland: Changing Social Landscapes in Middle America (University of Illinois Press; 2013) 344 pages; on the growth of the Latino work force in Oklahoma, Kansas, Nebraska, Arkansas, Missouri, and Iowa.
 Bullock, Charles S., III and Hood, M. V., III. "A Mile-wide Gap: the Evolution of Hispanic Political Emergence in the Deep South." Social Science Quarterly 2006 87 (special Issue): 1117-1135.  Fulltext: in Blackwell Synergy
 Chavez, Thomas E. Spain and the Independence of the United States. University of New Mexico Press (2004), 424 pp. 
 García, María Cristina. Havana, USA: Cuban Exiles and Cuban Americans in South Florida, 1959–1994 (1996); excerpt and text search
 Korrol, Virginia Sánchez. From Colonia to Community: The History of Puerto Ricans in New York City, 1917–1948 (1994)
 Millard, Ann V. and Chapa, Jorge.  Apple Pie and Enchiladas: Latino Newcomers in the Rural Midwest. 2004. 276 pp. excerpt and text search
 Murphy, Arthur D., Colleen Blanchard, and Jennifer A. Hill, eds.  Latino Workers in the Contemporary South. 2001. 224 pp. 
 Padilla, Felix M.  Puerto Rican Chicago. (1987). 277 pp. 
 Sãnchez Korrol, Virginia E. From Colonia to Community: The History of Puerto Ricans in New York City. (1994) complete text online free in California; excerpt and text search
 Vargas, Zaragosa. Proletarians of the North: A History of Mexican Industrial Workers in Detroit and the Midwest, 1917-1933 (1993) complete text online free in California; excerpt and text search
 Whalen, Carmen Teresa, and Victor Vásquez-Hernández, eds.  The Puerto Rican Diaspora: Historical Perspectives (2005),

Primary sources
 Ellis, Richard, ed. New Mexico Past and Present: A Historical Reader. 1971.
 Mintz, Steven, ed. Mexican American Voices: A Documentary Reader. 2009.
 Moquin, Wayne, ed. A Documentary History of the Mexican Americas (1971)   400pp
 Weber, David J. ed. Foreigners in Their Native Land: Historical Roots of the Mexican Americans'' (1973), primary sources to 1912

Chicano literature
.
.
.
.
.
 Prampolini, Gaetano, and Annamaria Pinazzi (eds). "The Shade of the Saguaro/La sombra del saguaro" Part II 'Mexican-American'. Firenze University Press http://www.fupress.com/ (2013): 149–342.
.
Vivancos Perez, Ricardo F. Radical Chicana Poetics. London and New York: Palgrave Macmillan, 2013.

Works of fiction
Bless Me, Ultima, Rudolfo Anaya (1972)
The House on Mango Street
Zoot Suit (play)

Mexican American
Bibliographies of countries or regions
Bibliographies of subcultures